María de los Ángeles Ortiz Hernández (born 18 February 1973 in Comalcalco, Tabasco) is a paralympian athlete from Mexico competing mainly in category F57/58 shot put events.

She competed in the 2008 Summer Paralympics in Beijing, China. There, she won a silver medal in the women's shot put F57/F58 event. Three years later she won the gold medal and world record in the same event at the 2011 IPC Athletics World Championships held in Christchurch, New Zealand. In 2011 won the gold medal and new world record in the Parapanamericans Games in Guadalajara, México, and silver medal in discus throw.

She became double Paralympic Champion by winning gold in London 2012 and Rio 2016.

She is daughter of Víctor Ángel Ortiz Tenorio, a baseball player.

References

External links
 

1973 births
Living people
Mexican female shot putters
Paralympic athletes of Mexico
Paralympic gold medalists for Mexico
Paralympic silver medalists for Mexico
Paralympic medalists in athletics (track and field)
World record holders in Paralympic athletics
Athletes (track and field) at the 2008 Summer Paralympics
Athletes (track and field) at the 2012 Summer Paralympics
Athletes (track and field) at the 2016 Summer Paralympics
Athletes (track and field) at the 2020 Summer Paralympics
Medalists at the 2008 Summer Paralympics
Medalists at the 2012 Summer Paralympics
Medalists at the 2016 Summer Paralympics
Medalists at the 2007 Parapan American Games
Medalists at the 2011 Parapan American Games
Medalists at the 2015 Parapan American Games
Medalists at the 2019 Parapan American Games
People from Comalcalco
Sportspeople from Tabasco
Sportspeople from Veracruz
Wheelchair shot putters
Paralympic shot putters